Jacek Kowalczyk (born 12 August 1981 in Katowice) is a footballer (defender) from Poland who last played for GKS Katowice.

Career
In his career he played for such a club as well like: GKS Katowice, Wisła Kraków, Polonia Warsaw.

In early August 2006 he signed a 2.5-year contract with the Odra Wodzislaw, and on 10 December 2008 they extended the contract for more than 2.5 years.

National team
He played 3 times for Poland national football team.

External links
 

Living people
1981 births
Polish footballers
Poland international footballers
GKS Katowice players
Wisła Kraków players
Polonia Warsaw players
Odra Wodzisław Śląski players
Sportspeople from Katowice

Association football defenders